The Folland Gnat was a single-seat jet fighter and training aircraft that served with the British, Finnish, Indian and Yugoslav air forces. The HAL Ajeet, or Gnat 2, is also included.

Australia
Stored or under restoration
Gnat T1 VH-XSO painted as XS101 at Melbourne, Victoria

Bangladesh
Stored or under restoration
HAL Ajeet at Bangladesh Air Force Museum, Dhaka
On display
Gnat F1 at Liberation War Museum, Dhaka

Finland

Stored or under restoration
Gnat F1 GN-101 at Finnish Airforce Museum located near Jyväskylä Airport
Gnat F1 GN-103 gateguard at Karelian Aviation Museum located at Lappeenranta Airport
Gnat F1 GN-104 gateguard at Finnish Airforce Museum located near Jyväskylä Airport
Gnat F1 GN-105 stored disassembled at the Finnish Aviation Museum located near Vantaa Airport, Helsinki 
Gnat F1 GN-106 at Karelian Aviation Museum located at Lappeenranta Airport
Gnat F1 GN-107 at Karhula Aviation Museum located at Kymi airfield near Kotka
Gnat F1 GN-110 on pole at the air defence memorial near gate to Jaeger Brigade Air Defence Battalion at Rovaniemi airfield.
Gnat FR1 GN-112 at Päijät-Häme Aviation Museum at Vesivehmaa airfield, north of Lahti
Gnat FR1 GN-113 stored disassembled at Helsinki-Malmi Airfield

India
Airworthy (2008)
Gnat F1 E265 Indian Air Force Historic Flight, Palam, Delhi

On display

Gnat F1 IE1059 at Indian Air Force Museum, Palam, Delhi
Gnat F1 IE1205 at Indian Air Force Headquarters Display, Delhi
Gnat F1 IE1246 at Indian Air Force Headquarters Display, Delhi
Gnat F1 at Kerala State Science and Technology Museum, Thiruvananthapuram
Gnat F1 IE1062 at Martyr's Memorial, Dharamshala
Gnat F1  at Nirmal Jit Singh Sekhon Memorial, Ludhiana
Gnat F1 E254 at Pragathi Maidan Defence Exhibition, New Delhi
HAL Ajeet E1975 at Indian Air Force Headquarters Display, Delhi
HAL Ajeet E1083 at Hindustan Aerospace War Memorial, Bangalore
HAL Ajeet IE1975 at Indian Air Force Museum, Palam, Delhi
HAL Ajeet E2016 at Indian Air Force Museum, Palam, Delhi
HAL Ajeet at Kangla Fort

Stored or under restoration
Gnat F1 at Air Force Bhararti School Display
Gnat F1 at Ambala Air Force Station War Memorial
Gnat F1 at Bagdogra Air Force Station Museum
Gnat F1 at Bareilly Air Force Station Museum
Gnat F1 Central Air Command Headquarters Museum, Allahabad
Gnat F1 at Chandigarh Air Force Station Museum
Gnat F1 at Defence Services Staff College Display Museum, Wellington, Tamil Nadu
Gnat F1 Painted as DJ1992 at Diamond Jubilee Museum, Midnapur
Gnat F1 E232 at Diamond Jubilee Museum, Midnapur
Gnat F1 E1046 at Hasimara Air Force Station Museum
Gnat F1 E1205 at Indian Air Force Historic Flight, Palam, Delhi
Gnat F1 E1246 at Indian Air Force Historic Flight, Palam, Delhi
Gnat F1 at Indian Air Force Technical College Collection, Bangalore
Gnat F1 E323 at Indian Air Force Technical College Collection, Bangalore
Gnat F1 at Lawrence School Memorial, Lovedale
Gnat F1 E261 at Maintenance Command Headquarters Display, Nagpur
Gnat F1 E1059 at Mayo College Memorial, Ajmer
Gnat F1 E247 at National Defence Academy, Pune
Gnat F1 at No.9 Airmen Selection Centre Memorial, Bhubaneshwar
Gnat F1 at Southern Air Command Headquarters Museum. Trivandrum
Gnat F1 IE1078 at Tambaram Air Force Station Museum
HAL Ajeet E1048 at Defence Services Staff College Display Museum, Wellington, Tamil Nadu
HAL Ajeet E1956at Diamond Jubilee Museum, Midnapur
HAL Ajeet IE1241 at Doon School Memorial,
HAL Ajeet at Eastern Air Command Headquarters Museum, Shillong
HAL Ajeet at Military College of Electrical and  Mechanical Engineering, Hyderabad
HA Ajeet painted as E1972 at St Mary's School Memorial, Pune

Gnat f1 at la martiniere college, lucknow
Gnat F1 at Jawahar bal bhavan in
Trissivaperoor Kerala

New Zealand
Under restoration
Gnat T1 XR987, now registered as ZK-RAJ. XR987 was one of the original YellowJacks aircraft and one of the founding aircraft of the Red Arrows of the Royal Air Force. Now at Tauranga Airport, New Zealand

Pakistan

Gnat F1 IE1083 at Pakistan Air Force Museum, Karachi

Serbia

On display
Gnat F1 11601 at the Belgrade Aviation Museum

United Kingdom

Airworthy
Gnat T1 G-FRCE at North Weald Aerodrome
Gnat T1 G-NATY painted as XR537 of the Royal Air Force at Bournemouth Airport
Gnat T1 G-RORI painted as XR538 of the Royal Air Force at North Weald Aerodrome
Gnat T1 G-MOUR painted as XR991 of the Royal Air Force at North Weald Aerodrome

On display

Gnat F1 XK724 at the RAF Museum Cosford
Gnat F1 XK740 at the Solent Sky Museum, Southampton, Hampshire
Gnat F1 XK741 painted as GN-101 of the Finnish Air Force at the Midland Air Museum, Coventry
Gnat T1 XM693 at the former Hamble Aerodrome, Hampshire
Gnat T1 XM697 at Reynard Garden Centre, Carluke, South Lanarkshire
Gnat T1 XP502 painted as XR540 at Cotswold Airport
Gnat T1 XP516 at Farnborough Air Sciences Trust, Farnborough, Hampshire
Gnat T1 XP534 painted as XR993 at Bruntingthorpe Aerodrome, Leicestershire
Gnat T1 XP542 at Air Cadets at Southampton, Hampshire.
Gnat T1 XR534 at Newark Air Museum
Gnat T1 XR571 at RAF Scampton
Gnat T1 XR574 at Trenchard Museum, RAF Halton
Gnat T1 XR977 at RAF Museum Cosford
Gnat T1 XS104 at North Weald Airfield

Stored or under restoration
Gnat F1 G-SLYR marked as E296 Indian Air Force
Gnat T1 XM708 at Blue Bird Project, Lytham St Anne's, Lancashire
Gnat T1 XP505 at Science Museum, Wroughton Aerodrome, Wiltshire
Gnat T1 XP540 at Bruntingthorpe Airfield
Gnat T1 XR541 at North Weald Airfield

United States

Airworthy
Gnat T1 N1CL of the Vietnam War Flight Museum at William P. Hobby Airport, Texas
Gnat T1 N19GT at Chino, California
Gnat T1 N316RF at San Diego, California
Gnat T1 N4347N at Fort Lauderdale, Florida
Gnat T1 N4367L at Austin, Texas
Gnat T1 N513X at Erie Municipal Airport, Colorado
Gnat T1 N533XP at Westchester County Airport, Connecticut
Gnat T1 N572XR painted as XR572 of the Royal Air Force at Rocky Mountain Metropolitan Airport, Broomfield, Colorado
Gnat T1 N7CV at California City, California (cancelled as exported to New Zealand 7 August 2019)
Gnat T1 N7HY at Chino, California
Gnat T1 N8130N at Tallahassee Regional Airport, Florida
Gnat T1 N8130Q at Front Range Airport, Colorado
Gnat T1 N936FC at East Islip, New York

On display
Gnat T1 XM694 at Pima Air Museum, Tucson, Arizona
Gnat F1 former Indian Air Force E-1076 at March Field Air Museum, Riverside, California.

Stored or under restoration
Gnat T1 N107XS at Greenwich, Connecticut
Gnat T1 N109XS at Front Range Airport, South Carolina
Gnat T1 N117SH at Lawrenceville, Georgia
Gnat T1 N6145X at Livermore, California
Gnat T1 N698XM painted as Royal Air Force XM698 at St Cloud, Florida
Gnat T1 N705XM at St Cloud, Florida
Gnat T1 N81298 at Front Range Airport, South Carolina
Gnat T1 N998XR at Front Range Airport, South Carolina

References

Bibliography

Folland Gnat
Gnat